Hugo Retro Mania is an action video game in the Hugo franchise, developed by Danish studio Progressive Media and published by Krea Medie in 2011 for the Android system mobile devices. Its iPad version is titled Hugo Retro Mania HD.  An update for the game was released on Halloween 2012. The game was also released on PC CD-ROM platform only in Germany as Hugo Retro: Zurück in der Mine by Software Pyramide.

Game

The game is a remake of the 1991 Commodore 64 game Skærmtrolden Hugo, which was itself based on the first season (1990) labyrinth scenario from the TV game show Hugo, but featuring all-new graphics and gameplay system. Unlike the original, the game features the evil witch Scylla (here renamed as "Sculla" and accompanied by her servant Don Croco from the Hugo Jungle Island series), complete with a version of the "Rope" end game from the 1990s Hugo games and TV show.

Reception
The game found 170,000 Danish customers in the first seven weeks on the market and was number one in countries such as Germany, Austria, Norway, Thailand, Chile, Turkey and Poland. It won the 2011 Best App Ever Awards in the Best Kids Game category, Android division. Since August 2012, it is now available for free at App Store.

See also
Hugo Troll Race

References

External links
Hugo Retro Mania - Android Apps on Google Play

2011 video games
Action video games
Android (operating system) games
Free-to-play video games
Hugo video games
IOS games
PlayStation (console) games
Retro-style video games
Video games developed in Denmark
Video games set in Europe
Video games with 2.5D graphics
Windows games
Video games set in Northern Europe